The 9th Frigate Squadron was an administrative unit of the Royal Navy from 1985 to 1993.

Squadron commander

References

See also
 List of squadrons and flotillas of the Royal Navy

Frigate squadrons of the Royal Navy